Hard Labor Creek Regional Reservoir is a  artificial reservoir in a region on the south-east side of unincorporated Walton County, Georgia, United States, near both Social Circle and Rutledge, about  east of Atlanta. It features a Category I earthen dam constructed primarily for municipal water supply, with a secondary consideration of recreation, on Hard Labor Creek.

First proposed in 1997, built in response to the growing controversy over the Tri-state water dispute, the State of Georgia with its 52 watershed regions drains primarily into either the Gulf of Mexico, or the Atlantic, with the reservoir existing in the Upper Oconee River watershed, which ultimately drains into the latter.

Recreation

The shores of the reservoir are private property. There is day parking, a boat ramp facility and modern rest room houses in operation. The reservoir and the parking area are gated and closed at night by a chain link barrier. Overnight occupancy or use of the lake is prohibited at any time other than the designated dawn-to-dusk boating and fishing hours.

References

External links
Archived view of official website

Reservoirs in Georgia (U.S. state)
Buildings and structures in Walton County, Georgia
Earth-filled dams